Juwan Fuad Masum (born 1972) is an Iraqi politician who was the Minister of Telecommunications, serving in the Iraqi Transitional Government.

Juwan Fouad Masum is the daughter of Fuad Masum, the former Iraqi president. She is a member of the Patriotic Union of Kurdistan (PUK). She graduated from King's College London with a PhD in communications.

References

1972 births
Alumni of King's College London
Government ministers of Iraq
Iraqi expatriates in the United Kingdom
Iraqi Kurdish women
Iraqi Kurdistani politicians
Iraqi Sunni Muslims
21st-century Iraqi women politicians
21st-century Iraqi politicians
Women government ministers of Iraq
Kurdish Muslims
Living people
Patriotic Union of Kurdistan politicians